The 1961 Paris–Tours was the 55th edition of the Paris–Tours cycle race and was held on 8 October 1961. The race started in Paris and finished in Tours. The race was won by Joseph Wouters of the Solo team.

General classification

References

1961 in French sport
1961
1961 Super Prestige Pernod
October 1961 sports events in Europe